Assault and Peppered  is a 1965 Warner Bros. Merrie Melodies cartoon directed by Robert McKimson. The short was released on April 24, 1965, and stars Daffy Duck and Speedy Gonzales.

Description
Titled as a play on the term "salt and pepper", Assault and Peppered''' was released on April 24, 1965. It was directed by Robert McKimson and produced by the award-winning DePatie–Freleng, the production house responsible for the Pink Panther and other series of cartoons distributed by United Artists. Its run time is six minutes. Mel Blanc voiced Daffy Duck, Speedy Gonzales, and the mice.

Plot
The cartoon is a semi-remake of Friz Freleng's Bunker Hill Bunny.

A group of starving mice are admiring Daffy Duck's Mexican plantation (aptly named El Rancho Rio Daffy), all the while wishing to have some of his homegrown food. Evil land baron, Daffy, who isn't particularly fond of beggars, suddenly appears and angrily whips the mice for "starving on his property" claiming "It lowers the value!" Unfortunately, Speedy Gonzales interrupts and startles Daffy, at which the little black duck declares war on the mouse, so they proceed to do battle in private forts.

In his fort, Speedy attempts to come up with a secret plan. When Daffy attempts to spy on him with a large telescope, Speedy berates him for it ("Hey! Is no fair to spy, that's cheating!") and pokes his end of the telescope, which on Daffy has the same effect of being poked in his eye. Daffy retaliates by firing the first shot from his cannon, which flies through Speedy's fort. Speedy redirects it towards Daffy, and runs towards his fort, informing him that his cannonball is returning before it hits Daffy. Speedy remarks "Cannonballs are very expensive. They shouldn't be wasted."

Daffy threatens to fire another cannonball at Daffy despite Speedy's protests ("But that's no fair! I got no cannonballs!") Daffy attempts to fire, but his cannon flips over and fires on him.

Speedy then goes to Daffy's fort and asks to borrow a cannonball. Daffy attempts to fire one at point-blank, but Speedy climbs inside and absconds with it, back to his fort. Daffy runs after him to force him to give it back, but Speedy fires it at Daffy, sending him inside his cannon, which likewise fires and sends Daffy and the cannonball back to Speedy's fort. Speedy retakes the cannonball from an injured Daffy.

Daffy then plants landmines across the area between both forts, but Speedy steals the chart showing where the mines are. Speedy promises to tell Daffy where they are so he can get back to his own fort, but he only reveals where each one is after'' Daffy steps on them, repeatedly blowing himself up. Speedy then asks "What you mean, you don't know where they are? You haven't missed one yet!", but Daffy tells Speedy to shut up as he collapses at his fort entrance.

In the end, Speedy (tired from doing battle with Daffy) quits and goes home. Daffy then declares victory and rewards himself with a 21 gun salute. Unfortunately, as he pulls the strings to fire his cannons, the cannons flip in his direction ("Mother!") and blast him one-by-one (with Speedy observantly keeping count).

See also
List of American films of 1965
 The Golden Age of American animation
 List of Daffy Duck cartoons

References

The Big Cartoon Database. Online. July 3, 2008.
DePatie-Freleng WB Cartoons. "Assault And Peppered."  Online. July 3, 2008.
Lawson, Tim and Alisa Persons. The Magic Behind the Voices: A Who's who of Cartoon Voice Actors Page 54. University Press of Mississippi. 2004. On Google Books. Online. July 3, 2008.

External links

1965 films
1965 animated films
1965 short films
Merrie Melodies short films
Warner Bros. Cartoons animated short films
Warner Bros. Animation animated films
Daffy Duck films
Speedy Gonzales films
DePatie–Freleng Enterprises short films
Films scored by William Lava
1960s Warner Bros. animated short films
1960s English-language films